Robert Varnajo (born 1 May 1929) was a French professional road bicycle racer. In the first part of his career, Varnajo won some road races, including a stage in the 1954 Tour de France. Later in his career, he specialized in track racing, and became French champion three times. He was born in Port-la-Claye-Curzon.

Major results

1952
Paris–Camembert
1953
Paris–Bourges
1954
Circuit des Boucles de la Seine
Tour de France:
Winner stage 23
1961
Poiré-sur-Vie
1962
 French National Stayers Championships
1963
 French National Stayers Championships
1964
 French National Stayers Championships

External links 

Official Tour de France results for Robert Varnajo

1929 births
Living people
French male cyclists
French Tour de France stage winners
Sportspeople from Vendée
Cyclists from Pays de la Loire